Walter Einsel (1926–1998) was an American sculptor and illustrator from Westport, Connecticut.

Biography
Einsel studied at Parsons The New School for Design, in New York, before taking on assignments from The New York Times. He eventually became art director for NBC, meeting his wife after applying for the same position with CBS. A large portion of his output, which has now become his legacy, were gifts created for his wife, Naiad Einsel. The couple shared a business as independent artists throughout the majority of his life. Together, they were the first married artists to create stamp designs for the U.S. Postal Service. They were hired together, to create an exhibition for the AT&T Age of Information Centre, producing fifty-five figures, with intricate details and moving parts. These were shown at Walt Disney World's EPCOT Center in Florida. 
In recent years before Walter Einsel's death, both artists were inducted into the Society of Illustrators Hall of Fame.

References 

1926 births
1998 deaths
People from Westport, Connecticut
American illustrators
20th-century American sculptors
American male sculptors
20th-century American male artists